Katraj is a village in the Karmala taluka of Solapur district in Maharashtra state, India.

Demographics
Covering  and comprising 273 households at the time of the 2011 census of India, Katraj had a population of 1354. There were 677 males and 677 females, with 162 people being aged six or younger.

References

Villages in Karmala taluka